Earl of Kinnoull (sometimes spelled Earl of Kinnoul) is a title in the Peerage of Scotland. It was created in 1633 for George Hay, 1st Viscount of Dupplin. Other associated titles are: Viscount Dupplin and Lord Hay of Kinfauns (1627) and Baron Hay of Pedwardine (1711). The former two are in the Peerage of Scotland, while the third is in the Peerage of Great Britain. The title of Viscount Dupplin is the courtesy title for the Earl's eldest son and heir.

History

The Hay clan descends from Norman-born knight Guillaume de la Haye, who was pincerna (cup bearer or butler) to Malcolm IV and William the Lion. Charles I advanced Sir George Hay to the peerage on 4 May 1627 under the titles of Lord Hay of  Kinfauns and Viscount Dupplin. On 25 May 1633, Hay was created the Earl of Kinnoull by King Charles I.

The Hay family share a common ancestor with the Earls of Erroll. Gilbert de la Hay (died April 1333), ancestor of the Earls of Erroll, was the older brother of William de la Hay, ancestor of the Earls of Kinnoull. In 1251, William received a charter of two carucates of land from his brother, which was confirmed by King Alexander III.

In 1711, the unofficial prime minister Robert Harley, 1st Earl of Oxford and Earl Mortimer, made his son-in-law Viscount Dupplin  Baron Hay of Pedwardine in the Peerage of Great Britain.

The family seat is Dupplin Castle, just outside Perth, Scotland.

Earls of Kinnoull (1633)
George Hay, 1st Earl of Kinnoull (d. 1634)
George Hay, 2nd Earl of Kinnoull (d. 1644), son of the first earl
George Hay, 3rd Earl of Kinnoull (d. 1650),  son of the second earl
William Hay, 4th Earl of Kinnoull (d. 1677), son of the second earl
George Hay, 5th Earl of Kinnoull (d. 1687), son of fourth earl 
William Hay, 6th Earl of Kinnoull (d. 1709), second son of the fourth earl
Thomas Hay, 7th Earl of Kinnoull (d. 1719), great-grandson of younger brother of the first earl
George Hay, 8th Earl of Kinnoull (1689–1758), son of the seventh earl
Thomas Hay, 9th Earl of Kinnoull (1710–1787), son of the eighth earl
Robert Hay-Drummond, 10th Earl of Kinnoull (1751–1804), nephew of the ninth earl
Thomas Hay-Drummond, 11th Earl of Kinnoull (1785–1866), son of the 10th earl
George Hay-Drummond, 12th Earl of Kinnoull (1827–1897), son of the 11th earl
Archibald Hay, 13th Earl of Kinnoull (1855–1916), third son of the 12th earl
George Harley Hay, 14th Earl of Kinnoull (1902–1938), grandson of the 13th earl
Arthur William George Patrick Hay, 15th Earl of Kinnoull (1935–2013), son of the 14th earl
 Charles William Harley Hay, 16th Earl of Kinnoull (b. 1962), son of the 15th earl

The heir apparent is the present holder's son, William Thomas Charles Hay, Viscount Dupplin (b. 2011).

Arms

See also
Kinnoull Hill

References

External links
The Official website of Clan Hay

 
Earldoms in the Peerage of Scotland
1633 establishments in Scotland
Noble titles created in 1633